Ion Geantă (12 September 1959 – 2 July 2019) was a Romanian sprint canoer who competed from the late 1970s to the mid-1980s. Competing in two Summer Olympics, he won a silver medal in the K-4 1000 m event at Moscow in 1980.

References

External links
 

1959 births
2019 deaths
Romanian male canoeists
Olympic canoeists of Romania
Olympic silver medalists for Romania
Olympic medalists in canoeing
Canoeists at the 1980 Summer Olympics
Canoeists at the 1984 Summer Olympics
Medalists at the 1980 Summer Olympics
20th-century Romanian people